Lizard Island Airport  is an airport on Lizard Island National Park in Queensland, Australia. It is served from Cairns by Hinterland Aviation.

Airlines and destinations

See also
 List of airports in Queensland

References

Airports in Queensland